Gullhella Station is a railway station located at Gullhella in Asker, Norway on the Spikkestad Line. The station was opened as part of the Drammen Line on 15 July 1937, but in 1973 the new Lieråsen Tunnel opened through Lieråsen, and the old part of the Drammen Line was transformed to a commuter train line.

The station is served by Oslo Commuter Rail trains to Oslo Central Station and onward to Lillestrøm Station. Heggedal is primarily a residential area. The station was refurbished 2009–10.

Railway stations in Asker
Railway stations on the Spikkestad Line
Railway stations opened in 1937
1937 establishments in Norway